The Papurí River is a river in South America. It emerges in the Vaupés Department of  Colombia and flows east, forming part of the international boundary between Colombia and the Amazonas state of Brazil. On the border, it flows into the Uaupés River.

See also
List of rivers of Amazonas

References
Brazilian Ministry of Transport

Rivers of Amazonas (Brazilian state)
Rivers of Colombia
International rivers of South America
Brazil–Colombia border